Lycée Professionnel Frédéric Bartholdi is a vocational senior high school in Saint-Denis, Seine-Saint-Denis, France, in the Paris metropolitan area.  it has 800 students.

References

External links
 Lycée Bartholdi 

Lycées in Seine-Saint-Denis